Thomas Poyntz (died May 1562) was an English merchant resident in Antwerp in the sixteenth century. He invited the English cleric William Tyndale to stay at his house while a refugee there. However in 1535 Henry Philips tricked Tyndale into leaving the safety of the Poyntz household whilst Poyntz attended the Easter fair in Bergen op Zoom.

Thomas was the son of William Poyntz (d. 1504) who held the manor of North Ockendon. His brother, John, inherited the estate. However when John died without issue Thomas inherited the estate in 1547.

Thomas was a member of the Worshipful Company of Grocers.

References

1562 deaths
Grocers